Henry III (1533 – 19 January 1598), a member of the House of Welf, was Duke of Brunswick-Lüneburg and ruling Prince of Lüneburg from 1559 until 1569, jointly with his brother William the Younger. From 1569, he ruled over the Lordship of Dannenberg until his death.

He was the second surviving son of Duke Ernest I of Brunswick-Lüneburg and assumed the rule in the Principality of Lüneburg upon the early death of his elder brother Francis Otto in 1559. He and his younger brother William fell out with each other in 1569, when Henry married the Ascanian princess Ursula of Saxe-Lauenburg (1545–1620), daughter of Duke Francis I, and demanded the partition of the Lüneburg lands.

He eventually waived his claims to the Lüneburg principality and received Dannenberg as a paréage as well as an annual payment in compensation. He also ensured that his descendants were entitled to inherit the Brunswick-Wolfenbüttel estates upon the extinction of the line; therefore, his youngest son Augustus could assume the rule in Wolfenbüttel in 1635.

Henry died in Dannenberg.

Marriage and children who reached adulthood
In 1569 Henry married Ursula of Saxe-Lauenburg (*1545 – 22 October 1620*, Schernebeck), daughter of Francis I of Saxe-Lauenburg. They had the following children:
 Julius Ernest (1571–1636)
 Francis (1572–1601) Provost of Strasbourg
 Anne Sophie (1573–1574) 
 Heinrich (1574–1575) 
 Sybil Elizabeth (1576–1630), married Anthony II, Count of Delmenhorst
 Sidonia (1577–1645)
 Augustus (1579–1666)

Princes of Lüneburg
1533 births
1598 deaths
Middle House of Lüneburg
New House of Brunswick